The Amazing Mr. Bickford is a video released by Frank Zappa in 1987, containing orchestral pieces by Zappa set to the clay animation of Bruce Bickford. It was released direct-to-video. To date it has not yet been released on DVD.

Music
 Naval Aviation In Art 
 Mo 'n Herb's Vacation
 Dupree's Paradise
 The Perfect Stranger

See also
Adult animation
List of stop motion films
List of animated feature-length films

External links

Bruce Bickford's official website
Cartoon Brew
Zappa Wiki Jawaka

1987 films
1987 animated films
1987 direct-to-video films
1980s American animated films
Clay animation films
Direct-to-video animated films
Films directed by Frank Zappa
1980s stop-motion animated films
Films scored by Frank Zappa
1980s English-language films